The 1976 Cincinnati Reds season was a season in American baseball. The Reds entered the season as the reigning world champions. The Reds dominated the league all season and won their second consecutive National League West title with a record of 102–60, finishing ten games ahead of the Los Angeles Dodgers. With the best record in baseball, they went on to defeat the Philadelphia Phillies in the 1976 National League Championship Series in three straight games to reach the World Series. They proceeded to win the title in four straight games over the New York Yankees. They were the third and most recent National League team to achieve this distinction, and the first since the 1921–22 New York Giants. The Reds drew 2,629,708 fans to their home games at Riverfront Stadium, an all-time franchise attendance record. As mentioned above, the Reds swept through the entire postseason with their sweeps of the Phillies and Yankees, achieving a record of 7-0.

Offseason
 October 24, 1975: Joaquín Andújar was traded by the Reds to the Houston Astros for players to be named later. The Astros completed the deal by sending Luis Sánchez and Carlos Alfonso (minors) to the Reds on December 12.
 December 12, 1975: Clay Carroll was traded by the Reds to the Chicago White Sox for Rich Hinton and Jeff  (minors).

Regular season

Season summary
The "Big Red Machine" was at the height of its power in the 1976 season, with four future Hall-of-Famers (Johnny Bench, Joe Morgan, Tony Pérez, and manager Sparky Anderson), the future MLB all-time hits leader Pete Rose, and a notable supporting line up including Dave Concepción at shortstop, and Ken Griffey, César Gerónimo, and George Foster in the outfield.

The Reds retained their NL pennant by winning the NLCS in three games over the Phillies, and their second consecutive World Series title by defeating the Yankees in four games, becoming only the second team to sweep a World Series from the Yankees (following the 1963 Los Angeles Dodgers). By sweeping both the Phillies and Yankees, the Reds became the first and only team to have a perfect postseason since the League Championship Series was started in 1969. Joe Morgan was the NL's Most Valuable Player for the second straight season and Johnny Bench was the World Series MVP.

To celebrate the National League's 100th anniversary, the Reds and several other teams adopted pillbox-style caps.

Season standings

Record vs. opponents

Notable transactions
 April 5, 1976: Merv Rettenmund was traded by the Reds to the San Diego Padres for Rudy Meoli.

Roster

Game log

|- style="text-align:center;"
| 1 || April 8 || Houston Astros || W 11–5 || 1–0 || Gary Nolan || J. R. Richard || Pedro Borbón || 52,949
|- style="text-align:center;"
| 2 || April 10 || Houston Astros || W 13–7 || 2–0 || Jack Billingham || Larry Dierker || Rawly Eastwick || 16,728
|- style="text-align:center;"
| 3 || April 11 || Houston Astros || W 9–3 || 3–0 || Pat Darcy || Joe Niekro || || 53,390
|- style="text-align:center;"
| 4 || April 13 || @ Atlanta Braves || W 6–1 || 4–0 || Fred Norman || Pablo Torrealba || || 37,973
|- style="text-align:center;"
| 5 || April 15 || @ Atlanta Braves || L 5–10 || 4–1 || Phil Niekro || Jack Billingham || || 15,716
|- style="text-align:center;"
| 6 || April 16 || San Francisco Giants || L 7–14 || 4–2 || Jim Barr || Pat Darcy || || 37,147
|- style="text-align:center;"
| 7 || April 17 || San Francisco Giants || W 11–0 || 5–2 || Fred Norman || Ed Halicki || || 21,219
|- style="text-align:center;"
| 8 || April 18 || San Francisco Giants || L 1–5 || 5–3 || John Montefusco || Gary Nolan || Gary Lavelle || 23,701
|- style="text-align:center;"
| 9 || April 20 || San Diego Padres || L 5–7 || 5–4 || Butch Metzger || Will McEnaney || || 18,126
|- style="text-align:center;"
| 10 || April 21 || San Diego Padres || W 5–4 || 6–4 || Fred Norman || Dave Wehrmeister || Rawly Eastwick || 16,603
|- style="text-align:center;"
| 11 || April 23 || @ Montreal Expos || L 4–5 || 6–5 || Don Stanhouse || Jack Billingham|| || 5,306
|- style="text-align:center;"
| 12 || April 24 || @ Montreal Expos || W 6–4 (11) || 7–5 || Rawly Eastwick || Don Carrithers || || 11,190
|- style="text-align:center;"
| 13 || April 25 || @ Montreal Expos || W 7–0 || 8–5 || Don Gullett || Steve Renko || Pat Darcy || 8,095
|- style="text-align:center;"
| 14 || April 26 || @ Philadelphia Phillies || L 9–10 || 8–6 || Tug McGraw || Rawly Eastwick  || || 16,565
|- style="text-align:center;"
| 15 || April 27 || @ Philadelphia Phillies || W 7–3 || 9–6 || Jack Billingham || Tom Underwood || || 17,818
|- style="text-align:center;"
| 16 || April 28 || @ Philadelphia Phillies || L 6–7 || 9–7 || Jim Lonborg || Pat Darcy || Tug McGraw || 20,215
|- style="text-align:center;"
| 17 || April 30 || Montreal Expos || W 7–2 || 10–7 || Gary Nolan || Dan Warthen || || 20,166
|-

|- style="text-align:center;"
| 26 ||May 1 || Montreal Expos || W 6–1 || 11–7 || Don Gullett || Don Carrithers || || 28,138
|- style="text-align:center;"
| 27 ||May 2 || Montreal Expos || L 4–8 (16)  || 11–8 || Don Stanhouse|| Pat Darcy ||  || 49,285
|- style="text-align:center;"
| 28 ||May 4 || @ New York Mets || L 3–5 || 11–9 || Tom Seaver || Fred Norman  || Skip Lockwood ||  11,205
|- style="text-align:center;"
| 29 || || || || || || || ||
|- style="text-align:center;"
| 30 || || || || || || || ||
|- style="text-align:center;"
| 31 || || || || || || || ||
|- style="text-align:center;"
| 32 || || || || || || || ||
|- style="text-align:center;"
| 33 || || || || || || || ||
|- style="text-align:center;"
| 34 || || || || || || || ||
|- style="text-align:center;"
| 35 || || || || || || || ||
|- style="text-align:center;"
| 36 || || || || || || || ||
|- style="text-align:center;"
| 37 || || || || || || || ||
|- style="text-align:center;"
| 38 || || || || || || || ||
|- style="text-align:center;"
| 39 || || || || || || || ||
|- style="text-align:center;"
| 40 || || || || || || || ||
|- style="text-align:center;"
| 41 || || || || || || || ||
|- style="text-align:center;"
| 42 || || || || || || || ||
|- style="text-align:center;"
| 43 || || || || || || || ||
|- style="text-align:center;"
| 44 || || || || || || || ||
|- style="text-align:center;"
| 45 || || || || || || || ||
|-

|- style="text-align:center;"
| 46 || || || || || || || ||
|- style="text-align:center;"
| 47 || || || || || || || ||
|- style="text-align:center;"
| 48 || || || || || || || ||
|- style="text-align:center;"
| 49 || || || || || || || ||
|- style="text-align:center;"
| 50 || || || || || || || ||
|- style="text-align:center;"
| 51 || || || || || || || ||
|- style="text-align:center;"
| 52 || || || || || || || ||
|- style="text-align:center;"
| 53 || || || || || || || ||
|- style="text-align:center;"
| 54 || || || || || || || ||
|- style="text-align:center;"
| 55 || || || || || || || ||
|- style="text-align:center;"
| 56 || || || || || || || ||
|- style="text-align:center;"
| 57 || || || || || || || ||
|- style="text-align:center;"
| 58 || || || || || || || ||
|- style="text-align:center;"
| 59 || || || || || || || ||
|- style="text-align:center;"
| 60 || || || || || || || ||
|- style="text-align:center;"
| 61 || || || || || || || ||
|- style="text-align:center;"
| 62 || || || || || || || ||
|- style="text-align:center;"
| 63 || June 18 || @ Philadelphia Phillies || L 5–6 || 39–24 || Jim Lonborg || Jack Billingham || Gene Garber || 50,635
|- style="text-align:center;"
| 64 || June 19 || @ Philadelphia Phillies || W 4–3 || 40–24 || Gary Nolan || Ron Reed || Rawly Eastwick || 36,808
|- style="text-align:center;"
| 65 || June 20 || @ Philadelphia Phillies || L 1–6 || 40–25 || Jim Kaat || Don Gullett || || 38,669
|- style="text-align:center;"
| 66 || || || || || || || ||
|- style="text-align:center;"
| 67 || || || || || || || ||
|- style="text-align:center;"
| 68 || June 23 || Philadelphia Phillies || L 2–4 || 42–26 || Ron Reed || Pedro Borbón || Gene Garber || 35,266
|- style="text-align:center;"
| 69 || June 24 || Philadelphia Phillies || L 4–5 || 42–27 || Jim Kaat || Gary Nolan || Tug McGraw || 34,053
|- style="text-align:center;"
| 70 || || || || || || || ||
|- style="text-align:center;"
| 71 || || || || || || || ||
|- style="text-align:center;"
| 72 || || || || || || || ||
|- style="text-align:center;"
| 73 || || || || || || || ||
|- style="text-align:center;"
| 74 || || || || || || || ||
|- style="text-align:center;"
| 75 || || || || || || || ||
|-

|- style="text-align:center;"
| 76 || || || || || || || ||
|- style="text-align:center;"
| 77 || || || || || || || ||
|- style="text-align:center;"
| 78 || || || || || || || ||
|- style="text-align:center;"
| 79 || || || || || || || ||
|- style="text-align:center;"
| 80 || || || || || || || ||
|- style="text-align:center;"
| 81 || || || || || || || ||
|- style="text-align:center;"
| 82 || || || || || || || ||
|- style="text-align:center;"
| 83 || || || || || || || ||
|- style="text-align:center;"
| 84 || || || || || || || ||
|- style="text-align:center;"
| 85 || || || || || || || ||
|- style="text-align:center;"
| 86 || || || || || || || ||
|- style="text-align:center;"
| 87 || || || || || || || ||
|- style="text-align:center;"
| 88 || || || || || || || ||
|- style="text-align:center;"
| 89 || || || || || || || ||
|- style="text-align:center;"
| 90 || || || || || || || ||
|- style="text-align:center;"
| 91 || || || || || || || ||
|- style="text-align:center;"
| 92 || || || || || || || ||
|- style="text-align:center;"
| 93 || || || || || || || ||
|- style="text-align:center;"
| 94 || || || || || || || ||
|- style="text-align:center;"
| 95 || || || || || || || ||
|- style="text-align:center;"
| 96 || || || || || || || ||
|- style="text-align:center;"
| 97 || || || || || || || ||
|- style="text-align:center;"
| 98 || || || || || || || ||
|- style="text-align:center;"
| 99 || || || || || || || ||
|- style="text-align:center;"
| 100 || || || || || || || ||
|- style="text-align:center;"
| 101 || || || || || || || ||
|- style="text-align:center;"
| 102 || || || || || || || ||
|- style="text-align:center;"
| 103 || || || || || || || ||
|- style="text-align:center;"
| 104 || || || || || || || ||
|-

|- style="text-align:center;"
| 105 || || || || || || || ||
|- style="text-align:center;"
| 106 || || || || || || || ||
|- style="text-align:center;"
| 107 || || || || || || || ||
|- style="text-align:center;"
| 108 || || || || || || || ||
|- style="text-align:center;"
| 109 || || || || || || || ||
|- style="text-align:center;"
| 110 || || || || || || || ||
|- style="text-align:center;"
| 111 || || || || || || || ||
|- style="text-align:center;"
| 112 || || || || || || || ||
|- style="text-align:center;"
| 113 || || || || || || || ||
|- style="text-align:center;"
| 114 || || || || || || || ||
|- style="text-align:center;"
| 115 || || || || || || || ||
|- style="text-align:center;"
| 116 || || || || || || || ||
|- style="text-align:center;"
| 117 || || || || || || || ||
|- style="text-align:center;"
| 118 || || || || || || || ||
|- style="text-align:center;"
| 119 || || || || || || || ||
|- style="text-align:center;"
| 120 || || || || || || || ||
|- style="text-align:center;"
| 121 || || || || || || || ||
|- style="text-align:center;"
| 122 || || || || || || || ||
|- style="text-align:center;"
| 123 || || || || || || || ||
|- style="text-align:center;"
| 124 || || || || || || || ||
|- style="text-align:center;"
| 125 || || || || || || || ||
|- style="text-align:center;"
| 126 || || || || || || || ||
|- style="text-align:center;"
| 127 || || || || || || || ||
|- style="text-align:center;"
| 128 || August 26 || Philadelphia Phillies || L 5–4 (13) || 80–48 || Tug McGraw || Rawly Eastwick || || 38,094
|- style="text-align:center;"
| 129 || August 27 || Philadelphia Phillies || W 4–1 || 81–48 || Fred Norman || Tom Underwood || Pedro Borbón || 49,821
|- style="text-align:center;"
| 130 || August 28 || Philadelphia Phillies || W 8–7 || 82–48 || Rawly Eastwick || Tug McGraw || || 51,091
|- style="text-align:center;"
| 131 || August 29 || Philadelphia Phillies || W 6–5 (15) || 83–48 || Santo Alcalá || Jim Kaat || || 51,376
|- style="text-align:center;"
| 132 || || || || || || || ||
|- style="text-align:center;"
| 133 || || || || || || || ||
|-

|- style="text-align:center;"
| 134 || || || || || || || ||
|- style="text-align:center;"
| 135 || || || || || || || ||
|- style="text-align:center;"
| 136 || || || || || || || ||
|- style="text-align:center;"
| 137 || || || || || || || ||
|- style="text-align:center;"
| 138 || || || || || || || ||
|- style="text-align:center;"
| 139 || || || || || || || ||
|- style="text-align:center;"
| 140 || || || || || || || ||
|- style="text-align:center;"
| 141 || || || || || || || ||
|- style="text-align:center;"
| 142 || || || || || || || ||
|- style="text-align:center;"
| 143 || || || || || || || ||
|- style="text-align:center;"
| 144 || || || || || || || ||
|- style="text-align:center;"
| 145 || || || || || || || ||
|- style="text-align:center;"
| 146 || || || || || || || ||
|- style="text-align:center;"
| 147 || || || || || || || ||
|- style="text-align:center;"
| 148 || || || || || || || ||
|- style="text-align:center;"
| 149 || || || || || || || ||
|- style="text-align:center;"
| 150 || || || || || || || ||
|- style="text-align:center;"
| 151 || || || || || || || ||
|- style="text-align:center;"
| 152 || || || || || || || ||
|- style="text-align:center;"
| 153 || || || || || || || ||
|- style="text-align:center;"
| 154 || || || || || || || ||
|- style="text-align:center;"
| 155 || || || || || || || ||
|- style="text-align:center;"
| 156 || || || || || || || ||
|- style="text-align:center;"
| 157 || || || || || || || ||
|- style="text-align:center;"
| 158 || || || || || || || ||
|- style="text-align:center;"
| 159 || || || || || || || ||
|-

|- style="text-align:center;"
| 160 || || || || || || || ||
|- style="text-align:center;"
| 161 || || || || || || || ||
|- style="text-align:center;"
| 162 || || || || || || || ||
|-

Player stats

Batting

Starters by position
Note: Pos=Position; G=Games played; AB=At bats; R=Runs scored; H=Hits; Avg.=Batting average; HR=Home runs; RBI=Runs batted in; SB=Stolen Bases

Other batters
Note: G=Games played; AB=At bats; R=Runs scored; H=Hits; Avg.=Batting average; HR=Home runs; RBI=Runs batted in; SB=Stolen Bases

Pitching

Starting pitchers
Note: G=Games pitched; IP=Innings pitched; W=Wins; L=Losses; ERA=Earned run average; SO=Strikeouts

Other pitchers
Note: G=Games pitched; IP=Innings pitched; W=Wins; L=Losses; ERA=Earned run average; SO=Strikeouts

Relief pitchers
Note: G=Games pitched; W=Wins; L=Losses; SV=Saves; ERA=Earned run average; SO=Strikeouts

Postseason

NLCS

Game 1
October 9, Veterans Stadium

Reds starter Don Gullett held the Phils to two hits in eight strong innings and helped his own cause with an RBI single in the sixth and a two-run double in the eighth. George Foster added a solo homer.

Game 2
October 10, Veterans Stadium

Game 3 
October 12, Riverfront Stadium

1976 World Series

Summary

Awards and honors
 Johnny Bench, Babe Ruth Award
 Johnny Bench, World Series Most Valuable Player Award
 Pete Rose, Roberto Clemente Award

1976 Major League Baseball All-Star Game
 Johnny Bench, catcher, starter
 Joe Morgan, second base, starter
 Pete Rose, third base, starter
 Dave Concepción, shortstop, starter
 George Foster, outfield, starter
 Tony Pérez, first base, reserve
 Ken Griffey, Sr., outfielder, reserve

Farm system

Notes

References
1976 Cincinnati Reds season at Baseball Reference

Cincinnati Reds seasons
Cincinnati Reds season
National League West champion seasons
National League champion seasons
World Series champion seasons
Cincinnati Reds